Strad may refer to:

 Stradivarius, a stringed instrument
 Steradian, the measurement of solid angles
 The Strad, a classical music magazine
 "Strad", by C418 from Minecraft - Volume Beta, 2013